Krzysztof Wiłkomirski (born 18 September 1980 in Warsaw) is a Polish judoka.

Achievements

External links
 
 

1980 births
Living people
Polish male judoka
Olympic judoka of Poland
Judoka at the 2004 Summer Olympics
Judoka at the 2008 Summer Olympics
Sportspeople from Warsaw